Robert Lucas, 3rd Baron Lucas (c.1649 – 31 January 1705) was an English nobleman and army officer.

A supporter of William III during the Glorious Revolution, he was made Constable of the Tower of London by the House of Lords to supersede Lord Dartmouth, an appointment subsequently confirmed by the King. He served in William's Flemish campaigns during the Nine Years' War, becoming lieutenant-colonel of Jacob's Regiment of Foot. Upon the accession of Queen Anne, he was replaced as Constable of the Tower by the Earl of Abingdon and given the colonelcy of a new regiment of foot.

He died on 31 January 1705; the barony of Lucas became extinct with him, while command of his regiment went to Lieutenant-Colonel Hans Hamilton. Richard Steele, then a captain in his regiment, left an epitaph in praise of his character.

Citations

References

1640s births
1705 deaths
34th Regiment of Foot officers
Barons Lucas
Lord-Lieutenants of the Tower Hamlets
Somerset Light Infantry officers